Royal Anthem (April 2, 1995 – 2018) was an American-bred and primarily British-trained Thoroughbred racehorse and sire. He won top-class races on both sides of the Atlantic.

Background
Royal Anthem is a dark-coated bay horse with a small white star bred by John A. Franks. He was sired by Breeders' Cup Turf winner Theatrical.

Purchased by The Thoroughbred Corp., he first raced from a base in England, where he was trained by Henry Cecil and ridden by jockey Kieren Fallon.

Racing career

1998: three-year-old season
Royal Anthem began racing at age three. He won the first two races he entered and went on to capture the 1998 King Edward VII Stakes at Ascot Racecourse. He was then moved up to Group One class to contest Britain's most prestigious all-aged race, the King George VI and Queen Elizabeth Stakes. He started at odds of 7/2 and finished third behind Swain and High-Rise.

After a break of almost three months, Royal Anthem was sent to Canada for the Canadian International Stakes at Woodbine Racetrack. Ridden by American jockey Gary Stevens, the colt beat defending champion and future Canadian Horse Racing Hall of Fame inductee Chief Bearhart by two lengths.

Royal Anthem was then sent to Churchill Downs in Kentucky to compete in the 1998 Breeders' Cup Turf. Six days before the race his trainer revealed that Royal Anthem was "hopping lame." Over the next few days, the horse appeared to recover but finished seventh of the fourteen runners behind Buck's Boy.

1999: four-year-old season
At age four in 1999, Royal Anthem finished second in the June 4 Coronation Cup to Daylami, a five-year-old who was his nemesis for the rest of the year. He finished second again in the Hardwicke Stakes, after which his handlers brought American jockey Gary Stevens to ride him in the Juddmonte International Stakes. Following an eight-length win, Royal Anthem was hailed by some in the United Kingdom as 'the best in the world'. However, in his next outing, he finished fifth to winner Daylami in the Irish Champion Stakes and second to Daylami again in the 1999 Breeders' Cup Turf at Gulfstream Park in Florida.

2000: five-year-old season
After the Breeders' Cup race, his owner sent Royal Anthem to the Payson Park thoroughbred training facility near Indiantown, Florida, where his conditioning was taken over by U.S. Hall of Fame trainer Bill Mott, who had trained Royal Anthem's sire, Theatrical. In February 2000, the horse made his first start for Mott with a win in the Gulfstream Park Breeders' Cup Handicap under jockey Jerry Bailey. He was scheduled to compete in the March 25 Dubai Sheema Classic at Nad Al Sheba Racecourse, but a swollen tendon in his left foreleg prevented him from competing and ended his racing career.

Stud career
Royal Anthem was retired to stand at stud at Hopewell Farm in Midway, Kentucky. He moved to Beech Tree Stud in 2016. The best of his progeny is probably multiple Grade I winner Presious Passion. Royal Anthem is the damsire of Belmont Stakes winner Palace Malice.

He died of the influence of lymphangitis in his back leg in 2018.

Pedigree

References

1995 racehorse births
2018 racehorse deaths
Racehorses bred in Kentucky
Racehorses trained in the United Kingdom
Racehorses trained in the United States
Thoroughbred family 8-k